Falkovitshella mongholica is a moth of the family Scythrididae. It was described by Pietro Passerin d'Entrèves and Angela Roggero in 2006. It is found in Mongolia and Uzbekistan.

The forewings and hindwings are whitish and glossy, with light brown dots on the whole surface.

References

Scythrididae
Moths described in 2006
Moths of Asia